...So Goes the Nation is a 2006 political documentary that follows the 2004 United States presidential election between John Kerry and George W. Bush, concentrating on the battleground state of Ohio.  The film interviews campaign workers on both sides and analyzes the outcome of the results.  The name comes from the saying that "As Ohio goes, so goes the nation". In 2004, Ohio swung the election, and in fact no Republican has ever won the White House without Ohio.

The documentary focused heavily on the rural-urban divide in Ohio, and the corresponding cultural and moral issues which, according to the documentary, played a pivotal role in the election.

See also
Swing states
2004 United States presidential election
United States presidential election in Ohio, 2004
As Maine goes, so goes the nation

References

External links
 

C-SPAN Q&A interview with James Stern and Adam Del Deo about ...So Goes the Nation, November 5, 2006

American documentary films
Documentary films about elections in the United States
2006 films
2004 United States presidential election
Films about presidential elections
United States presidential elections in Ohio
Politics of Ohio
Films about George W. Bush
Documentary films about Ohio
2000s English-language films
Films directed by Adam Del Deo and James D. Stern
2000s American films